Che Puan Besar Hajjah Haminah, formerly known as Sultanah Haminah (née Haminah binti Hamidun; born 15 July 1953) is the former Sultanah consort of Malaysian State of Kedah and is the widow of Sultan Abdul Halim Mua'dzam Shah. Born a commoner from Bagan Serai, Perak, she married Sultan Abdul Halim on 25 December 1975, and as his second wife, she was styled as Yang Teramat Mulia Che Puan Kedah. She was crowned Sultanah (Queen Consort) on 9 January 2004 at the Balai Penghadapan Istana Anak Bukit following the death of Tuanku Bahiyah, the previous Sultanah and first wife of Sultan Abdul Halim. She served as the 14th Raja Permaisuri Agong of Malaysia (Supreme Queen Consort) from 2011 to 2016, during her husband's second term as Yang di-Pertuan Agong, the Malaysian federal head of state. After her husband's death in September 2017, his successor and her brother-in-law, Sultan Sallehuddin, bestowed the title of Yang Maha Mulia Che Puan Besar of Kedah Darul Aman, roughly equivalent to a queen dowager.

Early life
Born on 15 July 1953 in Kampung Matang Jelutong, Bagan Serai, Perak. She is the fourth of seven siblings born to father Haji Hamidun bin Taib and mother Hajjah Isma binti Mohamad. HRH Tuanku Hajah Haminah was educated at Sekolah Kebangsaan Matang Jelutong and later Sekolah Menengah Inggeris Bagan Serai.

Royalty
On 25 December 1975, at age 23, Haminah married HRH The Sultan of Kedah, Sultan Abdul Halim and became his second wife. She received the title HH Che Puan Kedah. HRH Sultan Abdul Halim's first wife, Tuanku Bahiyah died on 26 August 2003. On 21 November 2003, HH Che Puan Haminah was proclaimed her successor as Sultanah of Kedah. Her coronation took place in the royal town of Anak Bukit on 9 January 2004.

Upon the installation of HRH Sultan Abdul Halim as HM The Yang di-Pertuan Agong XIV on 13 December 2011, HRH Tuanku Hajah Haminah became HM The Raja Permaisuri Agong. HRH Tuanku Hajah Haminah is the fourth commoner who become a Raja Permaisuri Agong after HRH Tuanku Bainun binti Mohamad Ali of Perak, HRH Tengku Permaisuri Siti Aishah of Selangor and HRH Tuanku Nur Zahirah of Terengganu.

Following the demise of HRH Almarhum Sultan Abdul Halim Mu'adzam Shah on 11 September 2017, she has been formally addressed as YMM Sultanah Hajjah Haminah during a brief period of time.

On 21 January 2018, in conjunction with the Sultan of Kedah, Sultan Sallehuddin's 76th birthday, she was conferred the title Yang Maha Mulia Che Puan Besar Kedah or HRH The Che Puan Besar of Kedah. She is now formally addressed as HRH Che Puan Besar Hajjah Haminah or simply HRH Tuanku Hajjah Haminah.

Interests
HRH Tuanku Haminah is known to enjoy golf, tennis, badminton, lawn bowling and music. She has participated in various golf tournaments in Kedah and initiated amateur women's golf tournaments such as the Kedah International Red Tee Invitational, as well as being invited as the royal guest for the International Lawn Bowls Mahsuri Cup in Langkawi. She also served as the first Chancellor of Management and Science University from 2004 until 2019.

Awards and recognitions

She has been awarded the following honours:

Honours of Kedah 
  Member of the Royal Family Order of Kedah (DK, 9 January 2004). 
  Member of the Halimi Family Order of Kedah (DKH, 15 July 2008).
  Member of the Supreme Order of Sri Mahawangsa (DMK, 20 January 2017) with title Dato' Seri Utama.

Honours of Malaysia 
  : 
  Recipient of the Order of the Crown of the Realm (DMN, 26 January 2012)

Foreign honours
 :
 Grand Cordon (Paulownia) of the Order of the Precious Crown (3 October 2012)

 :
 Dame Grand Cross (First Class) of the Order of Chula Chom Klao (2 September 2013)

Places named after her 
Several places were named after her, including:
 Sultanah Haminah Mosque in Pendang, Kedah
 Taman Tuanku Haminah, a residential area in Sungai Petani, Kedah
 Pusat Perdagangan Tuanku Haminah, a trade centre in Alor Setar, Kedah
 Dewan Tuanku Permaisuri Hajah Haminah, Universiti Islam Antarabangsa Sultan Abdul Halim Mu'adzam Shah in Kuala Ketil, Kedah
 Wisma Yayasan Anak anak Yatim Sultanah Haminah in Kedah

Notes

References

1953 births
People from Perak
Living people
Royal House of Kedah
Kedah royal consorts
Malaysian royal consorts
Malaysian Muslims
Malaysian people of Malay descent

Members of the Royal Family Order of Kedah
Members of the Halimi Family Order of Kedah
Members of the Supreme Order of Sri Mahawangsa

Grand Cordons of the Order of the Precious Crown
Dames Grand Cross of the Order of Chula Chom Klao
Malaysian queens consort
Recipients of the Order of the Crown of the Realm